Palau d'Esports de Granollers is an arena in Granollers, Catalonia. It is primarily used for team handball and is the home arena of BM Granollers. The arena, projected by the Catalan architect Pep Bonet, holds 5,685 people and was opened in 1991 for the 1992 Summer Olympics. During those games, it hosted the handball competitions. It is managed by the city of Granollers.

References
1992 Summer Olympics official report.  Volume 2. pp. 284–7.

Buildings and structures completed in 1991
Olympic handball venues
Indoor arenas in Catalonia
Venues of the 1992 Summer Olympics
Sports venues completed in 1991
Indoor arenas in Spain
1991 establishments in Spain
BM Granollers
Granollers
Handball venues in Spain